Robert William Fagan (March 27, 1894 – January 19, 1960) was an American Negro league second baseman in the 1920s.

A native of Henderson, Kentucky, Fagan played for the Kansas City Monarchs in 1921, and for the St. Louis Stars in 1923. He died in Fort Worth, Texas in 1960 at age 65.

References

External links
 and Seamheads

1894 births
1960 deaths
Kansas City Monarchs players
St. Louis Stars (baseball) players
20th-century African-American sportspeople
Baseball infielders
People from Henderson, Kentucky